The Triple Negative Breast Cancer Foundation ("TNBC Foundation" or "TNBCF") is a nonprofit organization dedicated to raising awareness of triple-negative breast cancer.  The foundation supports scientists and researchers in their efforts to determine the definitive causes of triple-negative breast cancer so that effective detection, diagnosis, prevention, and treatment can be pursued and achieved.

Since its inception in 2006, TNBCF has raised over $2 million to further this mission.

History 
TNBC Foundation was founded in 2006 in honor of Nancy Block-Zenna, who, at age 35, was diagnosed with triple-negative breast cancer. In response to her diagnosis, her close friends launched the TNBC Foundation to raise awareness and support research for this particular type of breast cancer. Block-Zenna died of the disease in 2007, 2 years after her diagnosis.

Symposium 
On December 11, 2007, the TNBC Foundation and Susan G. Komen for the Cure convened one of the first "think tanks" dedicated specifically to triple-negative breast cancer. The meeting was held prior to the opening of the annual San Antonio Breast Cancer Symposium.

Thirty researchers, from leading cancer institutions in North America and Europe, were invited to share information on the latest science, to discuss potential research collaborations and develop a scientific agenda for future research and clinical trials to find effective treatment for women with this subtype of breast cancer. The meeting also marked the first joint effort between TNBCF and Susan G. Komen for the Cure to share resources to accelerate research and progress for women who are not benefiting from recent advances in breast cancer research.

The goal of the meeting was to create the first comprehensive publication and white-paper summarizing the "state of the science" with input and authorship from leading researchers from around the world who have been dedicated specifically to this subtype of the disease. The publication will also include a roadmap and recommendations for planning, funding and designing the next level of research with the goal of identifying effective, tailored therapies for these women, thereby further reducing the rates of breast cancer mortality around the world.

Co-chairing the symposium were Allison Axenrod, executive director of TNBCF, and Hayley Dinerman, TNBCF's director of operations. The program was planned by TNBC's medical advisory board, which includes Dr. Winer as well as Lisa A. Carey, medical director of the University of North Carolina Lineberger Comprehensive Cancer Center, and George W. Sledge, Jr., professor of Medicine and Pathology and co-chair of the Breast Cancer Program at the Indiana University School of Medicine.

TNBC has convened the Symposium each year since 2007. In 2010, over 30 researchers and scientists attended the Symposium, which was again co-sponsored by Susan G. Komen for the Cure and the Breast Cancer Research Foundation (BCRF). That year, the TNBCF awarded its first independent grants to two researchers who were doing research in the area of triple-negative breast cancer.

Grant initiatives
In 2008, the Triple Negative Breast Cancer Foundation co-funded a research grant with the Susan G. Komen for the Cure Foundation.  TNBCF's initial $500,000 contribution marks the first time a nonprofit partner has co-funded one of Komen's "Promise Grants". Worth $7.5 million over five years, Promise Grants are designed to bring clinical researchers and basic scientists together to deliver new treatments for patients as quickly as possible. The Promise Grant was awarded to Dr. Andreas Forero of the University of Alabama, Birmingham Comprehensive Cancer Center. Forero and his team are researching a new targeted therapy for triple-negative breast cancer.

References

External links 
 The Triple Negative Breast Cancer Foundation website 

Charities based in New Jersey
Cancer charities in the United States
Medical and health organizations based in New Jersey